Luiz Mancilha Vilela (6 May 1942 – 23 August 2022) was a Brazilian Roman Catholic prelate.

Mancilha Vilela was born in Brazil and was ordained to the priesthood in 1968. He served as the bishop of the Roman Catholic Diocese of Cachoeiro de Itapemirim, Brazil, from 1986 to 2002 and was coadjutor bishop and bishop of the Roman Catholic Archdiocese of Vitória, Brazil, from 2002 until his retirement in 2018.

References

1942 births
2022 deaths
Brazilian Roman Catholic bishops
Brazilian Roman Catholic archbishops
21st-century Roman Catholic archbishops in Brazil
People from Pouso Alto